Squatting in Nepal occurs when people live on land or in buildings without the valid land ownership certificate (known as a Lal PurJa). The number of squatters has increased rapidly since the 1980s, as a result of factors such as internal migration to Kathmandu and civil war. In March 2021, the chairperson of the Commission on Landless Squatters stated that all landless squatters would receive ownership certificates within the following eighteen months.

History 

Squatting in Nepal is the occupation of property without a valid land ownership certificate (known as a Lal PurJa), or renting property when the purported owner does not have the certificate. Poor migrants moving from the countryside to the capital Kathmandu inhabited temples and public buildings up until the 1980s, then informal settlements appeared from the late 1980s onwards. The squatters had migrated from rural areas and were unable to find other options for housing. In 1985, there were an estimated 2,000 squatters in the capital Kathmandu and three years later the total was 3,700. By 1992, the number was thought to be between 8,000 and 10,000. In 1997, the total had risen to 12,000 with 9,000 living in informal settlements and 3,000 in derelict public buildings. Since the Nepalese Civil War began in 1996, displaced people have moved to Kathmandu. To begin with occupations occurred on public land beside rivers, more recently private land has also been seized.
By 2003, Kathmandu had 63 squatter settlements, with between 20,000 and 40,000 inhabitants. During the state of emergency from 2001 until 2004, the government evicted squatters from Tin Kune, Shankhamul and Thapathali. In 2019, according to the Nepal Landless Democratic Union Party there were 29,000 squatters in the Kathmandu Valley living in 73 sites.

Nepal has protected areas and there have been instances of people being displaced from their homes when these areas are created. When the Sukla Fata wildlife reserve was enlarged in 1981, 3,000 families were evicted. Whilst some were resettled, many began squatting in the forest nearby. People have also been displaced from Bardiya National Park and Chitwan National Park. People have also migrated from mountainous regions to the Terai, a lowland area, squatting on the edge of forests, beside rivers and on public land. The Squatters' Problem Solving Commission (SPSC) has attempted to regularize the settlements by providing a land ownership certificate where possible. In Sunwal, there are informal settlements at Kerabari, Ramuwapur, Simaltari Charpala, Sirjanatole and Sundarbasti.

During the COVID-19 pandemic in Nepal, the lockdown resulted in poor squatters who normally made a living from scavenging coming close to starvation.

Legal 

In 1996, the government introduced the National Action Plan, which proposed to upgrade informal settlements. Squatters are called "sukumbasi" but the word has negative connotations and thus is not embraced by squatters themselves. There are three types of squatter, namely occupiers, squatter-landlords who rent out accommodation and squatter-tenants who rent property. The Government of Nepal amended the Land Rules in December 2020 so that all squatters and landless Dalits could receive title to land, subject to certain conditions. The Landless Squatters' Problem Resolution Commission announced urban squatters in the Kathmandu Valley could receive up to 130 m2 and elsewhere in the country up to 340 m2. In agricultural areas, squatters could be given up to 2,000 m2 and in the mountains, 3,000 m2.

In March 2021, the chairperson of the Commission on Landless Squatters stated that all landless squatters would receive ownership certificates within the following eighteen months. It estimated that across the country there were 2.1 million people living without land rights.

References 

Housing in Nepal
History of Nepal (1951–2008)
History of Nepal (2008–present)
Nepal